Isabella Wieser is a road cyclist from Austria. She represented her nation at the 2002, 2005, and 2006 UCI Road World Championships. She won the Austrian National Road Race Championships in 2002.

References

External links
 profile at Procyclingstats.com

Austrian female cyclists
Living people
Place of birth missing (living people)
Year of birth missing (living people)
21st-century Austrian women